Isabel Province (also spelled Ysabel) is one of the provinces of Solomon Islands. The province had a population of around 35,257 as of 2020, mostly concentrated on the main island, Santa Isabel Island. The capital of the province is Buala on Santa Isabel Island, which has scheduled airline services to Honiara on Solomon Airlines from Fera Airport, on Fera Island, a 15-minute boat ride from Buala.

The province has an economy dominated by subsistence agriculture with occasional plantations for cash crops such as copra, and by logging activities. The province is seldom visited by tourists due to poor infrastructure, lack of roads, hotels, modern medical care, and endemic malaria. Most areas have a "Rest House", a house where guests can seek accommodation for the night or two, but many residents are willing to take in visitors for the night.

Santa Isabel is the longest Island in the Solomon Islands. The first European contact to the Solomon Islands was made by Spanish navigator Álvaro de Mendaña de Neira in 1568, who gave them their name.

Administrative divisions
Isabel Province is sub-divided into the following wards:

 Isabel Province (26,158)
Kia (1,929)
Baolo (1,148)
Kokota (1,177)
Hovikoilo (1,988)
Buala (2,813)
Tirotongana (689)
Koviloko (1,234)
Kmaga (1,862)
Kaloka (962)
Tatamba (1,404)
Sigana (2,394)
Japuana (2,163)
Kolomola (949)
Kolotubi (1,671)
Susubona (1,907)
Samasodu (1,868)

Islands
 Arnarvon
 Kerehikapa
 Fera Island
 Maleivona
 Onogou Island
 San Jorge
 Santa Isabel
 Sikopo
 Mahige
 Barora Fa'a
 Barora Ite
Papatura F'a
Papatura Ite

People

Musicians

 Young Davie

Bands
Sisirikiti
Saba
Kekene
Sisiva
Siuli
Vahi Kokoi
Tripple L
Dodoili
Desert Sound
Jana
Sunset Aedo
Sivoli
D square
Saroko
Monast
Salu Company
Glogu
Flalo
Hard Start
Ghoffa
Sugili & Faghalo sound
Ramposa

References

External links
 Provincial Profile of Isabel by constituency, People First Network 
 Community Media programme in Isabel Province, 2009
 Multimedia and social network for Isabel media programme
 Isabel Youth Learning4Peace
 Isabel photo gallery from Ministry of Commerce and Tourism
 Guguha distance learning centre, Isabel

Provinces of the Solomon Islands
 
States and territories established in 1981